Paul Goddard (born 12 October 1959 in Harlington, Middlesex, England) is an English former professional footballer and manager.

Biography and career 
During his playing career, he gained caps for England U21s (scoring five times) and earned a single full cap for the England team against Iceland in June 1982 (scoring once). In his fifteen-year career as a centre forward, he played for Queens Park Rangers, West Ham United, Newcastle United, Derby County, Millwall and Ipswich Town.

A QPR youth, Goddard was West Ham's record signing when he moved to Upton Park for £800,000 in 1980. He was West Ham's top scorer in the 1982–83 season, and scored 71 goals in 213 League and Cup matches for the club. One of these goals was in the replay of the 1981 Football League Cup Final defeat to Liverpool. At the start of the 1985–86 season he partnered Tony Cottee in the West Ham front line, but injury ruled him out after one game. This led to Cottee being partnered by Frank MacAvennie, and the MacAvennie-Cottee partnership yielded 54 goals in one season, taking West Ham to 3rd place in the league.

He then moved to Newcastle United in October 1986. He then moved on to Derby County in 1988 before signing for Millwall for a club record transfer fee in December 1989.

In 1991, he moved to Ipswich Town on a free transfer and enjoyed a few more years in the Premier League before retiring in 1994. During the 1994/95 season, he was temporarily caretaker-manager with old teammate John Wark between the departure of John Lyall and the arrival of George Burley and went on to become the club's youth team coach.

Later he worked as assistant manager at West Ham United for Glenn Roeder, a former teammate when he played at QPR and Newcastle United. He left that post on 20 January 2004, shortly after the arrival of new manager Alan Pardew.

, Paul lives with his family in East Bergholt, Suffolk and since 2005 has worked for the Stellar Group for their football agency.

Goddard was capped once for England at senior level, on 2 June 1982, a 1–1 friendly draw against Iceland, during which he scored England's only goal. The game was originally an England B fixture but was subsequently upgraded to full international status meaning Goddard was awarded his cap. Despite this successful appearance, he was not selected for the World Cup squad that summer and never played a senior match for England again.

Honours
West Ham United
Football League Second Division: 1980–81

Individual
PFA Team of the Year: 1980–81 Second Division
Newcastle United Player of the Year: 1986–87

References

External links

1959 births
Living people
English footballers
England international footballers
England B international footballers
England under-21 international footballers
Queens Park Rangers F.C. players
Newcastle United F.C. players
Millwall F.C. players
Derby County F.C. players
Ipswich Town F.C. players
English football managers
West Ham United F.C. players
Ipswich Town F.C. managers
Premier League managers
People from East Bergholt
People from Harlington, London
Premier League players
West Ham United F.C. non-playing staff
Footballers from the London Borough of Hillingdon
Association football forwards
Association football coaches
Ipswich Town F.C. non-playing staff